The 1979 North Dakota Fighting Sioux football team, also known as the Nodaks, was an American football team that represented the University of North Dakota as a member of the North Central Conference (NCC) during the 1979 NCAA Division II football season. Led by Gene Murphy in his second and final season as head coach, the Fighting Sioux compiled an overall record of 10–2 with a mark of 5–1 in conference play, winning the NCC title. The team played home games at Memorial Stadium in Grand Forks, North Dakota.

Schedule

Roster

References 

North Dakota
North Dakota Fighting Hawks football seasons
North Dakota Fighting Sioux football